Betancourth is a surname. Notable people with the surname include:

Arley Betancourth (born 1975), Colombian footballer
Daniel Betancourth (born 1980), Ecuadorian singer
Juliana Betancourth (born 1986), Colombian actress
Robin Betancourth (born 1991), Guatemalan footballer